Maurizio is an Italian masculine given name, derived from the Roman name Mauritius. Mauritius is a derivative of Maurus, meaning dark-skinned, Moorish.

List of people with the given name Maurizio

Art and music
 Maurizio Arcieri (born 1945), singer
 Maurizio Bianchi (born 1955), pioneer of noise music
 Maurizio Cattelan (born 1960), artist
 Maurizio Cazzati (1616–1678), composer
 Maurizio Colasanti (born 1966), conductor
 Maurizio De Jorio, italo disco and Eurobeat musician
 Maurizio Lobina (born 1973), keyboardist
 Maurizio Pollini (born 1942), classical pianist
 Maurizio, minimal techno production duo
 Maurizio Iacono (born 1975), singer for Death Metal band Kataklysm

Film, television, and media
 Maurizio Costanzo (born 1938), television personality
 Maurizio De Santis, film producer
 Maurizio Giuliano (born 1975), writer and journalist 
 Maurizio Merli (1940–1989), film actor
 Maurizio Nichetti (born 1948), film screenwriter, actor and director
 Maurizio Romano (1966–2003), voice actor
 Maurizio Silvi, Italian make-up artist

Military and politics
 Maurizio Bevilacqua (born 1960), Canadian politician
 Maurizio Cheli (born 1959), air force officer and ESA astronaut
 Maurizio Cocciolone (born 1960), Italian Air Force officer who served with UN Coalition forces
 Maurizio Galbaio (died 787), seventh traditional and fifth historical Doge of Venice
 Maurizio Gasparri (born 1956), politician
 Maurizio Giglio (1920-1944), Italian soldier, policeman and secret agent for the Allies during World War II
 Maurizio Lupi (born 1959), Italian politician
 Maurizio Pagani (1936–2014), Italian engineer and politician

Sports
 Maurizio Anastasi (born 1977), football midfielder
 Maurizio Arrivabene (born 1957), Italian Team Principal of Scuderia Ferrari (2014-2019)
 Maurizio Ciaramitaro (born 1982), football midfielder
 Maurizio Damilano (born 1957), former race walker
 Maurizio Domizzi (born 1980), football defender
 Maurizio Fondriest (born 1965), retired road racing cyclist
 Maurizio Ganz (born 1968), former football forward
 Maurizio Gaudino (born 1966), German retired football midfielder
 Maurizio Gherardini (born 1955), sportsman
 Maurizio Lanzaro (born 1982), footballer
 Maurizio Marchetto (born 1956), former ice speed skater
 Maurizio Margaglio (born 1974), ice dancer
 Maurizio Oioli (born 1981), male skeleton racer
 Maurizio Perissinot (1951–2004), rally co-driver
 Maurizio Sarri (born 1959), Football coach
 Maurizio Stecca (born 1963), former boxer
 Maurizio Zaffiri (born 1978), rugby player

Other
 Maurizio Di Gati (born 1966), Sicilian mafioso
 Maurizio Gucci (1948–1995), businessman
 Maurizio Minghella (born 1958), serial killer
 Maurizio Molinari (born 1964), journalist
 Maurizio Zamparini (born 1941), businessman

List of people with the family name Maurizio
Adam Maurizio (1862–1941), Swiss botanist and food technologist.

Italian masculine given names
Sammarinese given names